Chilseo-myeon is a myeon in northern Haman County, Gyeongsangnam-do, South Korea.  It is composed of nine ri, and has a total area of 35.96 km².  A largely rural area, it has a population of 6,568 (December 2004 reg.)

Local attractions include the temple of Musansa and the dinosaur footprints of Daechi-ri.  A water purification facility operated by Masan City is also located in Chilseo-myeon.

Chilseo is a very small farming town consisting of mostly: Korean families with small children, highschool aged teenagers, farmers and Indian, Pakistani and Filipino factory workers. The only attractions here are the: relatively new swimming pool and gym facility, the public bath/health center, the innumerable soju bars, singing rooms, hairshops and that's about it. There are two small grocery stores which are a 30-minute walk from Chilseo to Chilwon.  Most of the landscape is filled with rice fields and grassy mountains.  There is an elementary school located in Chilwon, a middle school and highschool in Chilseo along with a close by Christian church. Surprisingly, there is only one temple, which is located in Chilwon, yet three Christian churches.  
There is no bus station, but various bus stops located around town.  Most of the bus stops are not indicated with a sign and can only be discovered either through direct questioning of residents or by small, bus time tables posted on the walls of close by businesses. To sum it up, this is a very small, farming community located in the true, South Korea, where many traditional ways of life still exist.  For example, I can see adjumas drying their chile peppers for the Winter's kim chi on their house roofs, the elderly sitting under a bridge on the ground eating their lunches to escape the Summer's heat, farmers cultivating their land, dogs raised for meat in small cages and watch inhabitants make their purchases at the weekly traditional open air market located in Chilwon.

External links
 Local government website, in Korean

Towns and townships in South Gyeongsang Province
Haman County